Brunier is a surname. Notable people with the surname include:

 Bill Brunier (1889–1956), Australian rules footballer
 Charles Brunier (1901–2007), French murderer and veteran of both World Wars who claimed to have been the inspiration for the book Papillon
 Jean Brunier (1896–1981), French racing cyclist
  (1825–1905), German writer and literary critic
Serge Brunier (born 1958), photographer, reporter and writer who has specialised in popular depictions of astronomical subjects
 Yves Brunier (born 1943), French puppeteer
Yves Brunier (architect) (1962–1991), French architect

See also
10943 Brunier, an asteroid named after Serge Brunier